Peter Grain may refer to:

Peter Grain (artist) (1785–1857), French-American artist
Sir Peter Grain (judge) (1864–1947), British extraterritorial judge